Andrew Charles Cyrille (born November 10, 1939) is an American avant-garde jazz drummer. Throughout his career, he has performed both as a leader and a sideman in the bands of Walt Dickerson and Cecil Taylor, among others. AllMusic biographer Chris Kelsey wrote: "Few free-jazz drummers play with a tenth of Cyrille's grace and authority. His energy is unflagging, his power absolute, tempered only by an ever-present sense of propriety."

Life and career
Cyrille was born in Brooklyn, New York, United States, into a Haitian family. He began studying science at St. John's University, but was already playing jazz in the evenings and switched his studies to the Juilliard School. His first drum teachers were fellow Brooklyn-based drummers Willie Jones and Lenny McBrowne; through them, Cyrille met Max Roach. Nonetheless, Cyrille became a disciple of Philly Joe Jones.

His first professional engagement was as an accompanist of singer Nellie Lutcher, and he had an early recording session with Coleman Hawkins. Trumpeter Ted Curson introduced him to pianist Cecil Taylor when Cyrille was 18.

He joined the Cecil Taylor unit in 1965, and worked with Taylor over a period of 15 years. He later formed a musical partnership with Milford Graves, and the two recorded a drum duet album in 1974. In addition to recording as a bandleader, he has recorded and/or performed with musicians including David Murray, Irène Schweizer, Marilyn Crispell, Carla Bley, Butch Morris and Reggie Workman. Cyrille was a member of the group, Trio 3, with Oliver Lake and Reggie Workman.

Discography

As leader or co-leader
 What About? (BYG Actuel, 1971) 
 Dialogue of the Drums (IPS, 1974) with Milford Graves 
 Celebration (IPS, 1975) - with Alphonse Cimber, Ted Daniel, Romulus Franceschini, Stafford James, Jeanne Lee, Elouise Loftin, Donald Smith, David S. Ware
 Junction (Whynot, 1976) with Ted Daniel, David S. Ware, Lisle Atkinson
 The Loop (Ictus, 1978)
 Metamusicians' Stomp (Black Saint, 1978) with Ted Daniel, David S. Ware, Nick DiGeronimo
 Nuba (Black Saint, 1979) with Jeanne Lee, Jimmy Lyons
 Special People (Soul Note, 1980) with Ted Daniel, David S. Ware, Nick DiGeronimo
 The Navigator (Soul Note, 1982) with Ted Daniel, Sonelius Smith, Nick DiGeronimo
 Andrew Cyrille Meets Brötzmann in Berlin (FMP, 1983)
 Something in Return (Black Saint, 1988) with Jimmy Lyons
 Irène Schweizer/Andrew Cyrille (Intakt, 1989)
 Burnt Offering (Black Saint, 1991) with Jimmy Lyons
 Galaxies (Music & Arts, 1991) with Vladimir Tarasov
 My Friend Louis (DIW/Columbia, 1992) with Adegoke Steve Colson, Oliver Lake, Hannibal Lokumbe, Reggie Workman
 X Man (Soul Note, 1993) with James Newton, Anthony Cox
 Ode to the Living Tree (Venus, 1995) with Adegoke Steve Colson, Fred Hopkins,  Oliver Lake,  David Murray, Mor Thiam
 Good to Go, with a Tribute to Bu (Soul Note, 1997) with James Newton, Lisle Atkinson
 Double Clutch (Silkheart, 1997) with Richard Teitelbaum
 Duo Palindrome 2002 Vols. 1 and 2 (Intakt, 2004) with Anthony Braxton
 Low Blue Flame (TUM, 2006) with Greg Osby
 Opus de Life (Porter, 2009) with Paul Dunmall and Henry Grimes
 Route de Frères (TUM, 2011) with Haitian Fascination (Lisle Atkinson, Frisner Augustin, Hamiet Bluiett, Alix Pascal)
 The Declaration of Musical Independence (ECM, 2016) with Bill Frisell, Ben Street, Richard Teitelbaum
 Proximity (Sunnyside, 2016) with Bill McHenry
 Lebroba (ECM, 2018) with Bill Frisell, Wadada Leo Smith
 The News (ECM, 2021) with Bill Frisell, Ben Street, David Virelles
 2 Blues for Cecil (Tum Records, 2022) with William Parker and Enrico Rava
 Evocation with Elliott Sharp and Richard Teitelbaum (Infrequent Seams, 2022)
 Music Delivery/Percussion (Intakt, 2023)

With Trio 3
 Live in Willisau (Dizim, 1997)
 Encounter (Passin' Thru, 2000)
 Open Ideas (Palmetto, 2002)
 Time Being (Intakt, 2006)
 Wha's Nine: Live at the Sunset (Marge, 2008)
 Berne Concert with Irene Schweizer (Intakt, 2009)
 At This Time with Geri Allen (Intakt, 2009)
 Celebrating Mary Lou Williams–Live at Birdland New York with Geri Allen (Intakt, 2011)
 Refraction – Breakin' Glass with Jason Moran (Intakt, 2013)
 Wiring (album) with Vijay Iyer (Intakt, 2014)
 Visiting Texture (Intakt, 2017)

As sideman 

With Muhal Richard Abrams
 Mama and Daddy (Black Saint, 1980)
 Blues Forever (Black Saint, 1982) – recorded in 1981
 Rejoicing with the Light (Black Saint, 1983)
 Colors in Thirty-Third (Black Saint, 1987) – recorded in 1986
 The Hearinga Suite (Black Saint, 1989)

With Ahmed Abdul-Malik
The Music of Ahmed Abdul-Malik (New Jazz, 1961)
Sounds of Africa (New Jazz, 1961)

With Charles Brackeen
 Attainment (Silkheart, 1988) – recorded in 1987
 Worshippers Come Nigh (Silkheart, 1988) – recorded in 1987

With John Carter
 Castles of Ghana (Gramavision, 1985)
 Dance of the Love Ghosts (Gramavision, 1986)
 Fields (Gramavision, 1988)
 Comin' On (hat Art, 1988)
 Shadows on a Wall (Gramavision, 1989)

With Walt Dickerson
 This Is Walt Dickerson! (New Jazz, 1961)
 Relativity (New Jazz, 1962)
 To My Queen (New Jazz, 1963) – recorded in 1962
 Jazz Impressions of Lawrence of Arabia (Dauntless, 1963)
 Walt Dickerson Plays Unity (Audio Fidelity, 1964)
 Tell Us Only the Beautiful Things (Whynot, 1975)
 Peace (SteepleChase,1976)
 Life Rays (Soul Note, 1982)

With David Haney
 Clandestine (CIMP, 2008)
 Conspiracy A Go Go (CIMP, 2008)
 Siege of Misrata (CIMP, 2018)

With Leroy Jenkins
 The Legend of Ai Glatson (Black Saint, 1978)
 Space Minds, New Worlds, Survival of America (Tomato, 1979)

With Peter Kowald
 Duos: Europa-America-Japan (FMP, 1991) one track
 Duos 2: Europa-America-Japan (FMP, 2003) one track

With Oliver Lake
 Otherside (Gramavision, 1988)
 Edge-ing (Black Saint, 1993)

With Grachan Moncur III
 New Africa (BYG Actuel, 1969)
 Exploration (Capri, 2004)

With David Murray
 3D Family (Hat Hut, 1978)
 David Murray/James Newton Quintet (DIW, 1991)
 Shakill's Warrior (DIW, 1991)
 Jazzosaurus Rex (Red Baron Records, 1993)
 Acoustic Octfunk (Sound Hills, 1993)
 Saxmen (Red Baron Records, 1993)
 Sacred Ground (Justin Time, 2007)
 Like a Kiss that Never Ends (Justin Time, 2001)

With Horace Tapscott
 The Dark Tree (hat Art, 1989)
 Aiee! The Phantom (Arabesque, 1996)

With Cecil Taylor
 Unit Structures (Blue Note, 1966)
 Conquistador! (Blue Note, 1968) – recorded in 1966
 Student Studies (BYG Actuel, 1973) – recorded in 1966
 The Great Concert of Cecil Taylor (Prestige, 1977) – live recorded in 1969. originally released as Nuits de la Fondation Maeght Vols. 1-3.
 Cecil Taylor Quartet in Europe (Jazz Connoisseur, 1969)
 Live in Stuttgart (Bootleg / Unauthorized, 1966/1969)
 Akisakila (Trio (Japan), 1973)
 Spring of Two Blue J's (Unit Core, 1973)
 Incarnation (FMP, 1999)
 Mixed to Unit Structures Revisited (compilation) (ezz-thetics, 2021)
 The Complete, Legendary, Live Return Concert (Oblivion, 2022)

With Mal Waldron
 Birthday Concert: Antwerp 1997 (Bootleg / Unauthorized, 1997)
 Soul Eyes (BMG, 1997)
 Live at North Sea Jazz Festival, The Hague (Bootleg / Unauthorized, 2001)

With others
 Geri Allen, The Printmakers (Minor Music, 1985)
 Billy Bang, A Tribute to Stuff Smith (Soul Note, 1992)
 Bill Barron, Hot Line (Savoy, 1962 [1964])
 Borah Bergman, The Human Factor (Soul Note, 1992)
 Borah Bergman and Peter Brötzmann, Exhilaration (Soul Note, 1997)
 Carla Bley, European Tour 1977 (ECM, 1978)
 Jean-Paul Bourelly, Jungle Cowboy (JMT, 1987)
 Anthony Braxton, Eight (+3) Tristano Compositions, 1989: For Warne Marsh (hatArt, 1989)
 Marion Brown, Afternoon of a Georgia Faun (ECM, 1970)
 Dave Burrell, Daybreak (Gazell, 1989)
 Kenny Burrell and Coleman Hawkins, Moonglow (Compilation; Prestige, 1981)
 Kenny Clarke, Milford Graves, and Famoudou Don Moye, Pieces of Time (Soul Note, 1984)
 Richard Davis, Total Package (Marge, 1997)
 Dave Douglas, Metamorphosis (Greenleaf Music, 2017)
 Dave Douglas and Uri Caine, Devotion (Greenleaf Music, 2019)
 Marty Ehrlich, Side By Side (Enja Records, 1991)
 Dennis González, The Earth and the Heart (Konnex, 1989)
 John Gordon, Step by Step (Strata-East, 1976)
 John Greaves, Peter Blegvad, and Lisa Herman, Kew. Rhone. (Virgin, 1977)
 The Group (Ahmed Abdullah, Marion Brown, Billy Bang, Sirone, Fred Hopkins, Cyrille), Live (NoBusiness Records, 2012)
 Charlie Haden, Liberation Music Orchestra (Impulse, 1969)
 Kip Hanrahan, Tenderness (American Clave, 1990)
 Coleman Hawkins, The Hawk Relaxes (Moodsville, 1961)
 Jazz Composer's Orchestra, The Jazz Composer's Orchestra (ECM, 1968)
 John Lindberg, A Tree Frog Tonality (Between the lines, 2000)
 Jimmy Lyons, Other Afternoons (BYG, 1969)
 Bill McHenry, La peur du vide (Sunnyside, 2012)
 Bill McHenry and Henry Grimes (as "Us Free"), Fish Stories (Fresh Sound, 2014)
 Ben Monder, Amorphae (ECM, 2016) – recorded in 2013
 Butch Morris, Dust To Dust (New World, 1991)
 Ivo Perelman, Children of Ibeji (Enja, 1991)
 Hugh Ragin, An Afternoon in Harlem (Justin Time, 1999)
 Eric Revis, City of Asylum (Clean Feed, 2013)
 Archie Shepp and Roswell Rudd, Live in New York (Verve, 2001) – live recorded in 2000
 Lonnie Liston Smith, Cosmic Funk (Flying Dutchman, 1974)
 John Tchicai and Reggie Workman, Witch's Scream (TUM, 2006)
 Bob Thiele Collective, Sunrise Sunset (Red Baron Records, 1990)
 Reggie Workman, Synthesis (Leo, 1986) – live

References

External links
Bill McHenry Quartet: Live At The Village Vanguard, Recent concert
 Andrew Cyrille at Answers.Com
 Audio Recordings of WCUW Jazz Festivals – Jazz History Database
 The FMP releases
 Portrait of Andrew Cyrille by Dominik Huber / dominikphoto.com
 Video with Stefan Roloff

1939 births
American jazz drummers
Avant-garde jazz musicians
BYG Actuel artists
CIMP artists
DIW Records artists
American jazz bandleaders
Living people
Musicians from New York City
American people of Haitian descent
20th-century American drummers
American male drummers
Air (free jazz trio) members
Jazz musicians from New York (state)
20th-century American male musicians
American male jazz musicians
Music & Arts artists
Intakt Records artists
ECM Records artists
Black Saint/Soul Note artists
NoBusiness Records artists